Christopher King is a British designer and producer of several grand strategy video games, most notably Hearts of Iron, Europa Universalis IV, Victoria II and Crusader Kings II.

He has spent most of his career working at Paradox Development Studio on most of the studio's main intellectual properties, before leaving in 2013 to found Crispon Games AB alongside former Paradox colleague Pontus Aberg.

By 2017, King had returned to Paradox Development Studio to work as a game director, but left for a second time in 2019.

Video games

The games developed, co-developed and/or produced by Chris King:

References

External links
 rtsguru.com 

British video game designers
Place of birth missing (living people)
Living people
Video game producers
Video game programmers
Year of birth missing (living people)